The Honda CB600F (known as the Hornet in Europe and Brazil and 599 in the U.S.) is a standard motorcycle manufactured by Honda. The 'Hornet' name was not taken to North America as AMC, and its successor, Chrysler, had trademarked the name with the AMC Hornet.

History

The Honda CB600F Hornet was introduced for Europe in 1998. The bike has a six-speed transmission. Its suspension consists of a single shock in the rear and a conventional telescopic fork in the front until it was succeeded by an upside-down fork in 2005. Its brakes are dual-disc, Nissin twin piston in the front and single-disc, Nissin single piston in the rear.

As a sport-oriented motorcycle that provides an upright riding position, it is considered a standard or "naked bike".

However, Honda did not increase the size of the fuel tank. A faired version, the CB600FS, was also introduced in 2000.

In 2003, Honda gave the CB600F version a make-over, with a larger fuel tank (  as opposed to the former ), and 'sharper' styling. The CB600S faired version was discontinued.

In 2005, the instrument cluster was modernised, and more importantly, it was fitted with inverted front forks, to improve road-holding and cornering stability.

Honda took the Hornet to the United States and Canadian market for the 2004 and 2006 model years. It was called the 599.

The highly revised CB600F model came out in April 2007.

In 2011, the model got a  facelift. The headlight assembly was changed and the instrument cluster uses LCD display. This bike shared many of the same componentsswingarm, fork, frame, engineas the Honda CBR600F that was reintroduced in 2011.

In November 2013, at the EICMA show, Honda debuted the all-new CB650F naked bike and CBR650F sport bike, to replace the outgoing CB600F Hornet in 2014.

In 2022, Honda announced the new Honda Hornet (CB 750 S) as the successor to the CB600F Hornet in Europe.

Specifications

See also
 Honda Hornet (disambiguation)

Notes

External links
Honda Hornet 600 reviews - MCN road tests of the Honda Hornet 600

CB600F
Standard motorcycles
Motorcycles introduced in 1998